Fredj Chtioui (born 5 July 1954) is a Tunisian boxer. He competed in the men's welterweight event at the 1976 Summer Olympics. In his first fight, he lost to David Jackson of New Zealand.

References

1954 births
Living people
Tunisian male boxers
Olympic boxers of Tunisia
Boxers at the 1976 Summer Olympics
Place of birth missing (living people)
Welterweight boxers
20th-century Tunisian people